Kek is the deification of the concept of primordial darkness in the ancient Egyptian Ogdoad cosmogony of Hermopolis. 

The Ogdoad consisted of four pairs of deities, four male gods paired with their female counterparts. Kek's female counterpart was Kauket. Kek and Kauket in some aspects also represent night and day, and were called "raiser up of the light" and the "raiser up of the night", respectively.

The name is written as kk or kkwy with a variant of the sky hieroglyph in ligature with the staff (N2) associated with the word for "darkness" kkw.

History

In the oldest representations, Kekui is given the head of a serpent, and Kekuit the head of either a frog or a cat. In one scene, they are identified with Ka and Kait; in this scene, Ka-Kekui has the head of a frog surmounted by a beetle and Kait-Kekuit has the head of a serpent surmounted by a disk.

In the Greco-Roman period, Kek's male form was depicted as a frog-headed man, and the female form as a serpent-headed woman, as were all four dualistic concepts in the Ogdoad.

In popular culture

In relation to the 2016 United States presidential election, individuals associated with online message boards, such as 4chan, noted a similarity between Kek and the character Pepe the Frog. This, combined with the frequent use of the term "kek" as a popular Korean onomatopoetic stand-in for the internet slang "lol", which was often paired with images of Pepe, resulted in a resurgence of interest in the ancient deity.

See also 
 Heqet
 Erebus

References

External links
  

Egyptian gods
Creator gods
Night gods
Darkness
Egyptian demons
Legendary amphibians
Personifications
Cat deities